The Academy for Sustainable Communities (ASC) is a national skills initiative that has been set up by the Department of Communities and Local Government. 

In April 2004, Sir John Egan, a leading industrialist and past president of the Institute of Management, reported on the skills and training needed to deliver the Government's Sustainable Communities Plan. A key recommendation of the Egan Review was a national centre for sustainable communities skills and knowledge. In October 2005, it was announced that the ASC’s first chief executive would be Gill Taylor, formerly Chief Executive of Burnley Borough Council.

The ASC has since developed Sir John Egan’s vision and is focusing its work on three target audiences: young people; professionals; and communities. The ASC is working with partners to develop new learning resources such as a Sustainable Communities Foundation Degree, undertake major research studies, launch careers drives and promote good practice.

External links
Academy for Sustainable Communities homepage
Department for Communities and Local Government homepage
Ask: What If?
Creating the Future Awards
Future Vision Awards

See also
Sustainability
Sustainable communities
Sustainable Communities Plan

Department for Levelling Up, Housing and Communities